Amoria ellioti, common name the Elliot's volute, is a species of sea snail, a marine gastropod mollusk in the family Volutidae, the volutes.

Description
The length of the shell varies between 50 mm and 110 mm.

Distribution
This marine species occurs off Northwest Australia.

References

 Bail P. & Limpus A. (2001) The genus Amoria. In: G.T. Poppe & K. Groh (eds) A conchological iconography. Hackenheim: Conchbooks. 50 pp., 93 pls.

External links
 

Volutidae
Gastropods described in 1864
Gastropods of Australia